General White may refer to:

United Kingdom
Geoffrey White (British Army officer) (1870–1959), British Army major general
George White (British Army officer) (1835–1912), British Army general
Henry Dalrymple White (1820–1886), British Army general
Martin White (British Army officer) (born 1944), British Army major general
Michael White (British Army officer) (1791–1868), British Army lieutenant general
Robert White (British Army officer) (1827–1902), British Army general

United States
A. Arnim White (1889–1981), U.S. Army major general
Anthony Walton White (1750–1803), Continental Army brigadier general
Daniel White (general) (1833–1895), Union Army general
Edward Higgins White Sr. (1901–1978), U.S. Air Force major general
Frank G. White (1910–2002), U.S. Army major general
George A. White (1880–1941), Oregon National Guard major general
Isaac D. White (1901–1990), U.S. Army four-star general
James White (general) (1747–1821), Tennessee Militia brigadier general
Jerry White (Navigators) (born 1937), U.S. Air Force major general
Julius White (1816–1890), Union Army brigadier general
Robert Michael White (1924–2010), U.S. Air Force major general
Robert P. White (born 1963), U.S. Army lieutenant general
Thomas D. White (1901–1965), U.S. Air Force four-star general
Thomas E. White (born 1943), U.S. Army brigadier general
Tim White (newscaster/reporter) (born 1950), U.S. Air Force Reserves brigadier general
William R. White (United States Army officer) (1887–1975), U.S. Army brigadier general
William J. White (general) (1925–2017), U.S. Marine Corps lieutenant general

Other
Brudenell White (1876–1940), Australian Army general

See also
Barney White-Spunner (born 1957), British Army lieutenant general
Attorney General White (disambiguation)